The Monroe Commercial Historic District is a  historic district in Monroe, Georgia which was listed on the National Register of Historic Places in 1983.  The listing included 33 contributing buildings.
  
Location: Spring and Broad Sts.

It includes work by architects Bruce & Morgan.

Architecture: Classical Revival, Late Victorian

It includes the Walton Hotel.

It includes the courthouse square of the Walton County Courthouse and surrounding commercial buildings.

References

Historic districts on the National Register of Historic Places in Georgia (U.S. state)
National Register of Historic Places in Walton County, Georgia
Victorian architecture in Georgia (U.S. state)
Neoclassical architecture in Georgia (U.S. state)
Buildings and structures completed in 1820